

Billiatt Wilderness Protection Area is a protected area located about  north of Lameroo in South Australia.

The wilderness protection area occupies in land in the gazetted localities of Billiatt, Lameroo and Sandalwood.

The wilderness protection area was proclaimed under the Wilderness Protection Act 1992 on 24 July 2008 on land excised from the Billiatt Conservation Park.  

It is classified as an IUCN Category Ib protected area.

See also
 Protected areas of South Australia

References

External links
Entry for Billiatt Wilderness Protection Area on protected planet

Wilderness areas of South Australia
Protected areas established in 2008
2008 establishments in Australia